Rasal may refer to:

 Rasal, Spain, a village in Aragon
 Rasal (record label), a Welsh label